Conversation is the only studio album by Long Beach hip hop duo the Twinz. It was released on August 22, 1995 through Def Jam Recordings and G-Funk Entertainment and was almost entirely produced by Warren G. Conversation found decent success on the Billboard charts, peaking at No. 36 on the Billboard 200 and No. 8 on the Top R&B/Hip-Hop Albums chart. Two singles were released from the album, "Round & Round" and "Eastside LB". "First Round Draft Pick" first appeared on the soundtrack to the 1994 film, Jason's Lyric.

Music videos
Four music videos were produced to promote the album: "4 Eyes 2 Heads", "Jump ta This", "Eastside LB" and "Round & Round" all received music videos. The group also performed "Round & Round" live on an episode of Nickelodeon's All That.

Track listing
All tracks produced by Warren G except for track #4, which was produced by Soopafly
 "Conversation # 1"
 "Round & Round" (featuring Nanci Fletcher)
 "Good Times" (featuring Nanci Fletcher)
 "4 Eyes 2 Heads" (featuring Gorgeous Judah Ranks)
 "Jump ta This"
 "Eastside LB" (featuring Tracey Nelson and Warren G)
 "Sorry I Kept You" (featuring Warren G)
 "Conversation # 2"
 "Journey Wit Me" (featuring Bo-Roc)
 "Hollywood" (featuring Neb, Jah-Skillz and Nanci Fletcher)
 "1st Round Draft Pick" (featuring Warren G)
 "Conversation # 3"
 "Don't Get It Twisted" (featuring New Birth)
 "Pass It On" (featuring Foesum and Warren G)

Samples
Eastside LB
"Free" by Deniece Williams
"Hot Sex" by A Tribe Called Quest
Good Times
"You Are My Everything" by Surface
Hollywood
"Hollywood" by Rufus and Chaka Khan
Pass It On
"People Make the World Go Round" by The Stylistics

References

1995 debut albums
Def Jam Recordings albums
Albums produced by Soopafly
Albums produced by Warren G
Twinz albums